Rodnomyn Erkhembayar (born 17 February 1960) is a Mongolian judoka. He competed in the men's half-middleweight event at the 1988 Summer Olympics.

References

1960 births
Living people
Mongolian male judoka
Olympic judoka of Mongolia
Judoka at the 1988 Summer Olympics
Place of birth missing (living people)